Rosston may refer to a place in the United States:

 Rosston, Arkansas
 Rosston, Indiana
 Rosston, Oklahoma
 Rosston, Texas